San Juan Island is the second-largest and most populous of the San Juan Islands in northwestern Washington, United States. It has a land area of 142.59 km2 (55.053 sq mi) and a population of 6,822 as of the 2000 census.

Washington State Ferries serves Friday Harbor, which is San Juan Island's major population center, the San Juan County seat, and the only incorporated town in the islands.

History 

The name "San Juan" originates from the 1791 expedition of Francisco de Eliza, who named the archipelago Isla y Archipiélago de San Juan to honor his patron sponsor, Juan Vicente de Güemes Padilla Horcasitas y Aguayo, 2nd Count of Revillagigedo. One of the officers under Eliza's command, Gonzalo López de Haro, was the first European to discover San Juan Island. During the Wilkes Expedition, American explorer Charles Wilkes renamed the island Rodgers Island; the Spanish name remained on British nautical charts and over time became the island's official name.

The island saw seasonal use for salmon fishing. The Hudson's Bay Company (HBC) established the first permanent, non-native settlement on the island on December 13, 1853, to create a sheep farm. The island was also occupied by Native Americans, many of whom arrived seasonally for fishing. The 1862 Pacific Northwest smallpox epidemic swept through the region, killing large numbers of indigenous people. Smallpox Bay, on the west side of San Juan Island, was named for victims of this epidemic.

Both the British and Americans asserted control of the island. A small force of American soldiers was sent to the island over concern for this issue and with Native American raids on American settlers. The territorial dispute over this island and the rest of the San Juan Islands heightened when an American settler shot an HBC pig, starting the Pig War in 1859. The dispute was finally resolved in favor of the Americans in 1872.

Island life

San Juan Island has a number of weekly newspapers and two online daily news sites: the San Juan Islander and the Island Guardian. The Island is dotted with numerous farms, and is a tourist-driven economy. The island hosts two substantial marinas, one in Friday Harbor, the other in Roche Harbor. Both count tall ships and large yachts as frequent visitors.

The Island has a hospital, the Peace Health Peace Island Medical Center.

Transportation to the Island is by boat, Washington State Ferries, seaplane, or by conventional aircraft. If traveling by seaplane, Friday Harbor is serviced by Northwest Seaplanes and Kenmore Air, both longtime operators in the area. The Friday Harbor Airport terminal is 1.3 miles from the Ferry Landing. Outside of Friday Harbor, the only major commercial establishment resort is the village of Roche Harbor, located on the northwest side of the island.

Other landmarks are the old English and American Camps at opposite ends of the island, which together comprise the San Juan Island National Historical Park, which commemorates the 1859 Pig War. Interpretive centers and reconstructed buildings, formal gardens, etc. recall the history of early European settlement in the area.
The University of Washington runs Friday Harbor Laboratories, a marine research lab and campus outside Friday Harbor. The campus has been extant since 1909 and has dormitories, a food service, and classrooms for holding lectures.

San Juan Island is considered a "small town" community, in that it is relatively quiet rural living with few distractions or incidents aside from tourism.  One notable resident would be Lisa "Ivory" Moretti, a retired female professional wrestler of World Wrestling Entertainment fame. In addition, many Hollywood stars and celebrities spend time on the island to avoid publicity and to seek some peace and quiet.

It has several attractions including The Whale Museum; a contemporary Art Museum building completed in 2015; the San Juan Community Theatre; the Sculpture Park (near Roche Harbor); the San Juan Historical Museum; and Lime Kiln Point State Park where visitors can watch orca pods swim by. Lime Kiln Park is so named because it housed a lime kiln and is home to the historic Lime Kiln Light. Camping is also available around the island.

Schools
Public schools are operated by the San Juan Island School District #149.  It operates four schools:  Friday Harbor Elementary School, Friday Harbor Middle School, Friday Harbor High School, Griffin Bay Schools (alternative high school, parent-partner home school program, online courses, and virtual school), and Stuart Island School (K-8). There are also two privately operated schools.

Ecology
The waters surrounding San Juan Island are home to a variety of species including red sea urchins and pinto abalone. Though no commercial fishing of abalone has ever been allowed in this area, recreational fishing of abalone was outlawed in 1994. The National Marine Fisheries Service listed pinto abalone as a Species of Concern in 2004.

In 2015, San Juan Island became a protected location under The Antiquities Act. On March 25 of that year, former President Barack Obama included San Juan Island and approximately 75 other sites located in the Salish Sea into the San Juan Islands National Monument.

Attractions 
There are a few small, family-run aquaculture farms in the San Juan Islands including Westcott Bay Shellfish Co, where visitors can buy oysters, clams, and mussels and see shellfish farming operations. Whale watching and night-time bioluminescence tours depart from Friday Harbor.

Notable people
 

Guthrie Burnett-Tison, performing artist

References

External links

San Juan Islander - daily news site
San Juan Island Chamber of Commerce

San Juan Island Heritage Historical collections from the San Juan Island Library District and local partners.
American Biography  A New Cyclopedia VOL 5  Page 28  San Juan Island and Northwest Boundary Survey by Archibald Campbell led to it being in the USA instead of Canada

San Juan Islands
Lime kilns in the United States
Places with bioluminescence